Barbara Kelly (1924–2007) was a Canadian-born actress and television panellist.

Barbara Kelly may also refer to:
 Dame Barbara Kelly (public servant) (born 1940), Scottish public servant
 Barbara L. Kelly (born 1966), Scottish-Irish musicologist

See also
Barbara Kelley (1920–1998), British police officer